Loja Province is one of 24 provinces in Ecuador and shares its southern border on the west with El Oro Province, on the north with El Azuay, and on the east with Zamora-Chinchipe. Founded on its present site in 1548 by Captain Alonso de Mercadillo (Spanish), the site had been previously moved and rebuilt from La Toma due to earthquakes. It also is named as "Cuxibamba Valley", from the Quichua language, which means the "Smiley Valley".

Overview 
Loja is located in a high Andean valley at an elevation of 7,300 feet (2,225 m). It had a population of 448,966 inhabitants at the 2010 census. It is recognized as being a friendly and pleasant city.  This was demonstrated when Loja, both the provincial capital and one of the oldest cities in Ecuador, won a community involvement award  in 2001 in recognition of the community's ongoing effort to support and to protect the environment.

Surrounded by two rivers, the Zamora and Malacatos, Loja has a variety of microclimates.  This unique position results in numerous ecological zones.  Based between the humid Amazon basin and the coastal sechura desert in Peru the environment consists of páramo, cloud forest and jungle landscapes. 86% of the province is covered by hills or mountains.

Its historical buildings and colonial architecture make the city of Loja a popular tourist attraction.

Famous for the Vírgen del Cisne religious festivals it organizes in September every year, Loja is also known for its musicians.  The city has a number of important music academies, including the Conservatorio Nacional de Musica, the house of the most influential musicians in Ecuador. The city is commonly referred to as the 'musical capital of Ecuador.' There are also two universities, Universidad Tecnica Particular De Loja and Universidad Nacional de Loja. There is an important law school here as well.

Just south of Loja (42 km) is Vilcabamba, which is known as the Valley of Longevity. Inhabitants of this community enjoy a long life span due to its ideal climate and local hot springs.  Researchers and scientists have regularly visited the town, studying its geographical conditions, climate, soil and water.  Articles have even appeared in well known periodicals such as Reader's Digest and National Geographic magazine, providing their own theories to the longevity of  Vilcabamba's inhabitants.

Loja is credited with being the first city in Ecuador to have acquire the means to produce electricity.  Electric power was supplied to the city by the introduction of the Itaipu Hydroelectric Dam, the original structure of which was completed in 1896.

Economy 

A lot of investment has been made recently in the cochinilla farms that provide commodities for both the textile and cosmetic industries.  La Toma historically has provided suitable conditions for many sugar plantations. Commodities such as sugar and coffee are not often grown to be exported internationally like cochinilla, but are instead bought and sold domestically.

Loja Province has seen its fair share of mining, predominantly gold and bauxite, which has consequently caused damage to the environment.

Demographics
Ethnic groups as of the Ecuadorian census of 2010:
Mestizo  90.2%
Indigenous  3.7%
White  2.9%
Afro-Ecuadorian  2.4%
Montubio  0.7%
Other  0.1%

Government and politics

Loja Province, much like other divisions in Ecuador, is divided into three main institutions.

 Municipio, which is elected by the population every four years and is headed by the Mayor (Jorge Bailón as of 2021)
 Prefectura, which is the government at a local level and is headed by the Prefecto.  This institution is responsible for all the 16 cantons and is elected by the population every four years.
 Gobernacion delegates the work from the president which is concentrated at the national level.  The candidate is elected by the president himself.

Ecology

The region is famous for plants, bird species, and butterflies which can often be seen in protected national parks, the most important being Podocarpus. This park is 1,463 square kilometres and has an elevation ranging from 1000 m to 3690 m. The park is home for a number of animals like bears and pumas as well as exotic birdlife. Over 40% of the park's 3,000–4,000 plant species are endemic, unique to this area. There are also more than 600 species of birds here.

 Cherimoyas: This tasty fruit occurs naturally in Loja Province, in the localities of Amaluza, Cariamanga, Gonzanamá, and Vilcabamba. Its natural occurrence comprises altitudes of 1500 to 2000 meters of altitude. Mean optimal annual temperature for cherimoya growing in Ecuador is between 18 and 20 °C. Optimal annual precipitation is 800 – 1,000 mm.

Cantons

The province is divided into 16 cantons. The following table lists each with its population at the 2010 census, its area in square kilometres (km2), and the name of its canton seat or capital.

See also
 El Airo, Loja
 Podocarpus National Park
 Provinces of Ecuador
 Cantons of Ecuador
 Saraguro people 
 Vilcabamba, Ecuador

References

External links

 Lojanos.com – informative Spanish website including local and national news, tourist information, and cultural and social events of Loja City and the province of Loja

 
Provinces of Ecuador
1548 establishments in the Spanish Empire